Wassy is a commune in the Haute-Marne department in north-eastern France. Its population, as of 2019, is 2,819. Wassy has been twinned with the German town of Eppingen in north-west Baden-Württemberg since 1967.

History
On 1 March 1562, a faction of armed soldiers under Francis, Duke of Guise attacked and killed worshippers at a Huguenot service, called the Massacre of Wassy, which marked the start of the First War of Religion in France.

Geography
The river Blaise flows through the commune.

Population

See also

Communes of the Haute-Marne department

References

External links

Official website of Eppingen (in German)
Protestant Museum of the Barn of Wassy (in French)

Communes of Haute-Marne
French Wars of Religion